Thallarcha isophragma is a moth in the subfamily Arctiinae. It was described by Edward Meyrick in 1886. It is found in Australia, where it has been recorded from Tasmania.

References

Moths described in 1886
Lithosiini